Princess Thyra of Denmark (Thyra Amalie Caroline Charlotte Anna; 29 September 1853 – 26 February 1933) was the youngest daughter and fifth child of Christian IX of Denmark and Louise of Hesse-Kassel. In 1878, she married Ernest Augustus, the exiled heir to the Kingdom of Hanover. As the Kingdom of Hanover had been annexed by Prussia in 1866, she spent most of her life in exile with her husband in Austria.

Thyra was the sister of King Frederik VIII of Denmark, Queen Alexandra of the United Kingdom, King George I of Greece, Empress Maria Feodorovna of Russia and Prince Valdemar of Denmark.

Birth and family

Princess Thyra Amelie Caroline Charlotte Anne was born on 29 September 1853 at the Yellow Palace, an 18th-century town house at 18 Amaliegade, immediately adjacent to the Amalienborg Palace complex in Copenhagen. She was the third daughter and fifth child of Prince Christian and Princess Louise of Denmark. As a child, she shared a bedroom with her elder sisters, Alexandra and Dagmar, and was taught how to sew and knit her own clothes and socks. Her family had been relatively obscure but happy until her father, Prince Christian of Schleswig-Holstein-Sonderburg-Glücksburg, was chosen with the consent of the great powers to succeed his childless distant cousin, Frederick VII, to the Danish throne. Just two months before Thyra's birth, the new Act of Succession had been passed and Prince Christian given the title of Prince of Denmark.

Early life 

In 1863, when Thyra was 10 years old, King Frederick VII died, and her father succeeded to the throne of Denmark as King Christian IX. Earlier the same year, her brother Vilhelm had been elected King of Greece, and her sister Alexandra had married Albert Edward, Prince of Wales. In 1866, her other sister Dagmar married the Tsarevich of Russia, Alexander. Princess Thyra was confirmed on 27 May 1870 by the Bishop of Zealand, Hans Lassen Martensen in the chapel of Christiansborg Palace in Copenhagen.

Thyra was an attractive and gentle young woman, with dark hair and dark blue eyes, and Queen Louise wanted her youngest daughter to make a good marriage as her elder daughters had. Thyra's first suitor was King Willem III of the Netherlands, but as he was thirty-six years older than she was, she rejected him.

In her youth, Thyra had fallen in love with Vilhelm Frimann Marcher, a lieutenant in the cavalry, which resulted in a pregnancy. Her brother George I of Greece suggested that she have the baby in Athens to avoid scandal; the Danish press was told Thyra had been taken ill with jaundice.

Marriage
 
On 21 December/22 December 1878, she married Crown Prince Ernest Augustus of Hanover, 3rd Duke of Cumberland and Teviotdale, at the chapel of Christiansborg Palace in Copenhagen. Ernst Augustus was the eldest child and only son of King George V of Hanover and his wife, Princess Marie of Saxe-Altenburg.

Ernest Augustus had been born as a Crown Prince of Hanover, but in 1866 his father had been deprived of his throne, when the Kingdom of Hanover was annexed by Prussia after siding with Austria in the Austro-Prussian War.

Later life
Her husband died on 14 November 1923. Thyra survived him by nine years and died in Gmunden, Upper Austria, on 26 February 1933.

Issue

The Duke and Duchess of Cumberland and Teviotdale had six children:

Ancestry

References

Citations

Bibliography

External links

 Princess Thyra at the website of the Royal Danish Collection at Amalienborg Palace

|-

1853 births
1933 deaths
Wives of British princes
Cumberland and Teviotdale
Crown princesses
Danish princesses
House of Glücksburg (Denmark)
House of Hanover
Hanoverian princesses by marriage
Burials at the Schloss Cumberland Mausoleum
Daughters of kings
Children of Christian IX of Denmark